Trio & a Bed is an interactive drama shown on Astro Wah Lai Toi, a pay TV channel in Malaysia, where viewers can vote on character decisions and the outcome. The show focuses on the complex chemistry and relationships between the three guys and three girls.

Cast
Carmen Soo as Charmaine
Amber Chia as Isabella
Annabelle Kong as Ho Hua Meow 
Daniel Tan as Heman
Danny Wan as Anerd
Jeffery Chong as Sam

Websites and news
Website for 'Trio & a Bed'
Wanita.net article on Trio & a Bed (In Chinese)

Cast members official websites
Official website for Amber Chia, star of Trio & a Bed
Official website for Daniel Tan, star of Trio & a Bed

Malaysian drama television series